The R251 road is a regional road in Ireland. It is located entirely in County Donegal and runs in a northerly then westerly direction from its junction with the R250 road west of Letterkenny to the N56 east of Gweedore. The route is very scenic: it passes Glenveagh, skirts around the base of Errigal and offers excellent views of the Derryveagh Mountains.

See also
Roads in Ireland
Motorways in Ireland
National primary road
National secondary road

References

Roads in County Donegal
Regional roads in the Republic of Ireland